The politics of Colombia take place in a framework of a presidential representative democratic republic, whereby the President of Colombia is both head of state and head of government, and of a  multi-party system. Executive power is carried out by the government. Legislative power is vested in both the government and the two chambers of congress, the Senate and the House of Representatives of Colombia. The Judiciary is independent of the executive and the legislature.

Constitutional reforms
Colombia's present constitution, enacted on July 5, 1991, strengthened the administration of justice with the provision for introduction of an adversarial system which ultimately is to entirely replace the existing Napoleonic Code. Other significant reforms under the new constitution provide for civil divorce, dual nationality, the election of a vice president, and the election of departmental governors. The constitution expanded citizens' basic rights, including that of "tutela," under which an immediate court action can be requested by individuals feeling that their constitutional rights are being violated and if there is no other legal recourse.

The national government has separate executive, legislative, and judicial branches.

Executive branch

The president is elected for a single four-year term. Between 2005 and 2015, the president could be re-elected for a second term. The 1991 constitution reestablished the position of vice president, who is elected on the same ticket as the president. By law, the vice president will succeed in the event of the president's resignation, illness, or death.

Since 2015, the president is barred from running for reelection, even for a nonconsecutive term.

Legislative branch

Colombia's bicameral Congress consists of a 108-member Senate of Colombia and a 172-member Chamber of Representatives of Colombia. Senators are elected on the basis of a nationwide ballot, while representatives are elected in multi member districts co-located within the 32 national departments. The country's capital is a separate capital district and elects its own representatives. Members may be re-elected indefinitely, and, in contrast to the previous system, there are no alternate congressmen. Congress meets twice a year, and the president has the power to call it into special session when needed.

Political parties and elections

2018 Presidential election

2018 Parliamentary election

Senate
{{#section-h:2018 Colombian par

Chamber of Representatives

Judicial branch

The civilian judiciary is a separate and independent branch of government. Guidelines and the general structure for Colombia's administration of justice are set out in Law 270 of March 7, 1996. Colombia's legal system has recently begun to incorporate some elements of an oral, accusatory system. The judicial branch's general structure is composed of four distinct jurisdictions (ordinary, administrative, constitutional, and special). Colombia's highest judicial organs are the Supreme Court, the Council of State, the Constitutional Court, and the Superior Judicial Council. Although all the high courts technically oversee separate jurisdictions, the Constitutional Court has a broad spectrum of judicial oversight which often allows it to rule on issues overseen by different jurisdictions and even weigh in directly in the rulings of other high courts.

International organization participation

Global 
United Nations
World Bank

Other

Regional

References

External links
House of Representatives of Colombia
Senate of Colombia
Presidency of Colombia
Supreme Court of Justice of Colombia

 

de:Kolumbien#Politik